Chiliocephalum is a genus of Ethiopian flowering plants in the family Asteraceae.

 Species
 Chiliocephalum schimperi Benth. - Ethiopia
 Chiliocephalum tegetum Mesfin- Ethiopia

References

Asteraceae genera
Gnaphalieae
Flora of Ethiopia